The Ostropomycetidae are a subclass of mostly lichen-forming fungi in the class Lecanoromycetes. The subclass was circumscribed in 2004 by Catherine Reeb, François M. Lutzoni, and Claude Roux. It contains ten orders and 36 families.

Arctomiaceae is the only family in the Ostropomycetidae that associates with cyanobacteria of the order Nostocales as its main photobiont partner.

Taxa of uncertain classification
The following taxa are of uncertain classification (incertae sedis) in the Ostropomycetidae:

Family incertae sedis:
Epigloeaceae 

Genera incertae sedis:
Amphorothecium  –  1 sp.
Anzina  – 1 sp.
Aspilidea  – 1 sp.
Bachmanniomyces  – 8 spp.
Dictyocatenulata  – 1 sp.
Malvinia  – 1 sp.
Pleiopatella  – 1 sp.

References

Lecanoromycetes
Lichen subclasses
Fungus subclasses
Taxa described in 2004
Taxa named by Claude Roux